Air Kazakhstan, stylised as Air Kazakstan ( / ), was an airline of Kazakhstan which later became its national carrier after bankrupt Kazakhstan Airlines was shut down. It was headquartered in Almaty.

History
The airline was established in 1991 as Kazakhstan Airways but changed to Air Kazakhstan on 10 March 1997 (spelled as "Air Kazakhstan" until 2001). It ceased operations on 29 February 2004, after accumulating heavy debts, and was declared bankrupt in April 2004 by the court in Almaty.

Air Astana succeeded Air Kazakhstan as the country's flag carrier.

Destinations
When it shut down, Air Kazakhstan was serving the following locations:

Fleet
 
Western jets: 

Airbus A310-300
Boeing 737-200
 

Soviet Jets:

Antonov An-24
Antonov An-24B
Antonov An-24RV
Antonov An-26
Antonov An-30
Antonov An-30A
Antonov An-30B
Ilyushin Il-18
Ilyushin Il-76
Ilyushin Il-76T
Ilyushin Il-86
Tupolev Tu-134
Tupolev Tu-134A
Tupolev Tu-154
Tupolev Tu-154A
Tupolev Tu-154B
Yakovlev Yak-40
Yakovlev Yak-40D
Yakovlev Yak-42

References

External links

 Official website (Archive)

Defunct airlines of Kazakhstan
Airlines established in 1996
Airlines disestablished in 2004
Former Aeroflot divisions
1996 establishments in Kazakhstan
2004 disestablishments in Asia